The Midland Riders' Championship was an individual speedway competition for top riders of teams from the Midlands.

Winners

Speedway competitions in the United Kingdom